Tallheo Hot Springs is a hot spring located on the west shore of South Bentinck Arm, an inlet on the Central Coast of British Columbia, Canada, located southwest of the community of Bella Coola.  The hot springs, which are known as  Ix7piixm in the Nuxalk language, are located opposite Bensins Island, the only island in South Bentinck Arm.

See also
Taleomey River
List of hot springs

References

Central Coast of British Columbia
Hot springs of British Columbia
Nuxalk